was a shugendō monk in Nara period Japan. He was raised in Echizen Province, which was in the southern portion of present-day Fukui Prefecture. He was the second son of Mikami Yasuzumi (三神安角). He is said to be the first person to reach the top of Mount Haku in neighboring Kaga Province and other peaks in the Ryōhaku Mountains.

Opened mountains
Taichō is said to be the first to have climbed the following mountains:
 Mount Haku
 Mount Ochizen (越智山)
 Mount Bessan

References

Japanese Buddhist clergy
People of Nara-period Japan
682 births
767 deaths
Shugendō practitioners
Nara period Buddhist clergy